Orthotylus paulinoi is a species of bug in the Miridae family that is endemic to Portugal.

References

Insects described in 1885
Endemic arthropods of Portugal
Hemiptera of Europe
paulinoi